Shaun Barker, known by the stage name Bruza, is a British grime MC and rapper from Walthamstow, East London.

Music career
He started his career in 1992 as a member of pop/R&B boy band Chaos who were discovered by Simon Cowell, later becoming known as Ultimate Kaos. He released one single with the group, "Farewell My Summer Love" (originally by Michael Jackson). He soon departed the group due to unknown reasons.

Bruza is known for rapping in a Cockney accent. Before grime music emerged in the early 2000s, Bruza was part of the drum and bass collective Reckless Crew going under the name of Chigga D.

His Christmas 2003 lyrical clash with Crazy Titch on a now defunct pirate radio station was captured on the DVD release of Lord of the Mics 1. He was briefly part of the Aftershock group before leaving. In early 2006, he collaborated with other grime artists to perform a fusion of grime and classical music at the Hackney Empire.

Discography

Singles 
2004: "Get Me"
2004: "Bruzin"

Collaborations 
2018: "Grime Originals RMX" (Sharky Major feat. Manga, Fumin, Bruza & Maxwell D)

References

External links
Bruza on BBC 1Xtra
Bruza - AAE Music
Bruza Discography on Discogs

Grime music artists
People from Walthamstow
Black British male rappers
Living people
Rappers from London
Year of birth missing (living people)